Um Pouco Mais is the debut studio album by the Portuguese pop singer Susana Félix. It was recorded in 1999 and released in that same year. The lead single of the album was "Mais Olhos (Que Barriga)", followed by "Um Lugar Encantado".

Conception
In 1999, Susana signed a contract with Farol to produce albums together with Renato Jr. Like Susana was to young to produce an album all by her own, she worked with a lot of people in the album. The album has a few cover songs, such as "Mais olhos (Que Barriga)", written by Mafalda Veiga, although most of the songs were written by Susana. The album was extremely successful in commercial terms; it peaked at number one in Portuguese charts. The album took a few months to get ready to sell in the market, and it was released in that same year.

Singles
 "Mais Olhos (Que Barriga)" was the lead single of the album and it was released in 1999. This song, became the most successful single by Susana, which launched her minor career to an expanded life full of work.
 "Um Lugar Ecantado" was the second and final single taken from the album, it also became a good mark in Susana's career. it was also released in 1999.

Reception

Critical

The album met with positive reviews and was well received by most critics. "ABCmusic" gave a rating of 3.5 out of 5 stars.
"Rate Your Music" was less positive, giving a non-professional rating of 2.5 out of 5 stars.

Promotion
In 2000, she toured the country from north to south on a tour of 40 shows.

Track listing
Mais Olhos (Que Barriga)  (Mafalda Veiga) 
Um Lugar Encantado  (Susana Félix) 
Do Lado de Lá do Azul  (Susana Félix) 
Por Quem Caminhar  (Susana Félix) 
Enquanto Houver  (Susana Félix) 
Vôo Cego  (Susana Félix) 
Quase Feliz  (Susana Félix) 
Coisas Dispersas  (Susana Félix) 
Deixa-me Lá Ficar  (Susana Félix) 
Tocar o Céu  (Susana Félix)

Personnel
Information retrieved from Susana's official blog.
Renato Junior - keyboards
Nuno Rafael - guitar
Alexandre Frazão - drums
Maximo Cavali - violi
Jorge Teixeira - Portuguese guitar
Vasco Brôco - violin
Tózé Miranda - violin
Jeremy Lake - violoncel
João Cabrita - saxophone
João Marques - fliscorne
Jorge Ribeiro - trombone

Charts

Release history

References

External links
Susana Félix Official site 

Susana Félix albums
1999 albums